Tropical Storm Beryl was an unusual Atlantic tropical cyclone that formed over southeastern Louisiana in August 1988. The second tropical storm of the 1988 Atlantic hurricane season, Beryl developed from a slow-moving trough of low pressure on August 8. The storm turned to the northwest over Louisiana and Texas, and slowly dissipated. The remnants of Beryl continued northward into the central United States, dropping some rainfall and providing relief to a severe heat wave.

The rainfall caused some reports of flooding, while prolonged durations of rough waves resulted in severe beach erosion. The waves capsized a boat in Mobile Bay, killing one of its passengers. Overall damage was minor, totaling about $3 million (1988 USD, $5.46 million 2009 USD).

Meteorological history

A weak surface trough of low pressure emerged into the northeast Gulf of Mexico on August 1. Under weak steering currents, the trough drifted westward, and slowly became better defined with the formation of a circulation in the mid- through upper-levels of the atmosphere. An upper-level low developed over Texas, providing unfavorable amounts of vertical wind shear. A surface circulation was first evident on satellite imagery on August 4 just off the coast of Mississippi, and for several days it remained nearly stationary over the Mississippi Sound. As the upper-level low over Texas drifted southwestward, an anticyclone developed over the system, with the circulation becoming better defined and more vertically aligned. On August 7, the system drifted into southeastern Louisiana. It continued to become better organized, and on August 8 it developed into Tropical Depression Three while located near the northern coast of Lake Pontchartrain. This is unusual in that tropical cyclones rarely form over land.

Upon becoming a tropical cyclone, the depression drifted southeastward, and within hours of its formation it emerged into the Gulf of Mexico. Based on ship reports and observations from oil rigs, it is estimated the depression intensified into Tropical Storm Beryl at 1000 UTC on August 8 while located just offshore coastal Louisiana. Shortly thereafter, a trough from the northwest dissipated the anticyclone and resulted in a steady northwest motion very near where the cyclone originally moved offshore. Beryl maintained tropical storm status for about 18 hours before weakening to a tropical depression over central Louisiana. It turned to the northwest, and the surface circulation dissipated on August 10 while located a short distance south of Shreveport, Louisiana. The surface low pressure area crossed into north Texas before dissipating early on August 12, while its upper-level circulation turned northward into Oklahoma before being merged by an approaching trough.

Preparations
Upon becoming a tropical storm, the National Hurricane Center issued a tropical storm warning from the mouth of the Mississippi River to Pensacola, Florida. Six hours later, the warning was extended westward to Morgan City, Louisiana. The threat of Beryl prompted some voluntary evacuations in St. Bernard Parish in Louisiana, and also forced the evacuations of thousands from offshore oil rigs. Officials advised small craft to remain at port from Port O'Connor, Texas to Pensacola, Florida.

Impact

Rainfall from the storm reached over  a short distance east of Pensacola, Florida, though impact in the state was minor. Rough waves overturned a shrimp boat in Mobile Bay. A 15-year-old boy on the boat drowned, the only direct fatality from the storm. The boy's father, also on the boat, spent 24 hours in the water before being rescued by the United States Coast Guard. The waves caused severe beach erosion along the coastline, with Dauphin Island losing  of beach.

Sustained winds reached  at Gulfport, the strongest wind on a land station. Similar to Alabama, strong waves caused considerable beach erosion along portions of the coastline.

Beryl dropped rainfall across much of Louisiana, peaking at over  near Morgan City. The rainfall caused significant river flooding along the Biloxi River. Wind gusts were fairly light across the state, reaching  in New Orleans. The winds caused light tree damage, which resulted in some power outages. A storm surge of about  caused some coastal flooding.

The rainfall flooded some roads and also causes severe river flooding on the Angelina River. Further inland, the remnants of Beryl cooled temperatures and provided relief to the severe heat wave in the central United States.

Throughout its path, Beryl caused about $3 million in damage (1988 USD, $5.46 million 2009 USD), primarily along the immediate coastline from erosion or flood damage.

See also

 Other tropical cyclones named Beryl
 List of wettest tropical cyclones in Alabama
 Tropical Storm Julia (2016) - the most recent storm to form over land

References

External links

National Hurricane Center Preliminary Report for Tropical Storm Beryl
1988 Atlantic Hurricane Season Summary

Beryl
Beryl (1988)
Beryl (1988)
Beryl (1988)
Beryl (1988)
Beryl (1988)
Beryl (1988)
Beryl (1988)
Beryl (1988)
1988 natural disasters in the United States
Beryl